Vamos Futsal Club Mataram is a professional futsal club in Indonesia. Currently playing in the Indonesia Pro Futsal League, they are located in Mataram, West Nusa Tenggara. Their main arena is GOR 17 Desember.

Players

Current squad

Non-playing staff

Coaching staff

Club Honours

National competitions
 Pro Futsal League
 Champions: 2017, 2018, 2019
 Runner-up: 2016

Continental competitions
 AFC Futsal Club Championship
 Quarter-finals: 2018, 2019
 Group stage: 2017

References

Futsal clubs in Indonesia
Sport in West Nusa Tenggara
Futsal clubs established in 2012
2012 establishments in Indonesia